East Stour may refer to:

East Stour, Dorset, a village in the English county of Dorset
East Stour, Kent, a river in the English county of Kent